Box Hill Institute is a provider of vocational and higher education located in the eastern suburbs of Melbourne in Victoria. The Box Hill Institute has three locations in Box Hill (Elgar, Nelson & Whitehorse), two in Lilydale (John St and Jarlo Dve), and one in Melbourne CBD, where it is co-located with the Centre for Adult Education.

History
Box Hill Institute is the descendant of two Box Hill area technical schools.

"Box Hill Technical School for Girls and Women" was opened on the 4th of September 1924, having welcomed 65 Junior pupils some six months before. The girls primary studied domestic subjects like housewifery, cookery, millinery and dressmaking. Some girls also took courses like accounting and secretarial work.

On the 2nd of February 1943 the "Box Hill Technical School for Boys" was established because many boys in the eastern suburbs were being turned away from Swinburne Technical School. They studied subjects like sheetmetal work, technical drawing and carpentry.

Throughout the 1960s and 1970s both technical schools added post-secondary options like certificates in business studies and engineering. The Girl's Technical School started the first business certificate course in 1967.

The Girls' Technical School was renamed "Whitehorse Technical School" in 1971. Around this time the Boy's Technical School separated its tertiary technical offerings from the secondary ones, the tertiary section becoming "Box Hill Technical School". Both schools were declared colleges of Technical and Further Education in late 1981.

On the 25th of January 1984, Whitehorse Technical School and Box Hill Technical School merged to become "Box Hill College of TAFE". 

On the 12 September 1995, the Governor in Council approved orders to change the name of Box Hill College of TAFE to Box Hill Institute of TAFE. The College was renamed "Box Hill Institute" ten years later.

Courses

Higher education
Box Hill Institute offers a range of higher education courses at a Masters, Graduate, and Undergraduate level. It covers areas such as biotechnology, animal science, music, music business, fashion, business, IT and more.

Vocational education
Box Hill Institute offers a large range of vocational courses. It covers areas including hospitality, tourism, health, beauty, automotive, transport, carpentry, electrical, refrigeration, construction, plumbing, engineering, business, commerce, art, graphic design, dance, music, fashion, live production, English, English as an additional language, ELICOS, VCAL, VCE and more.

Awards
In 2015 Box Hill Institute won more than 20 awards, including Excellence in International Education at the Victorian Internal Education Awards.

In 2013 Box Hill Institute was declared International Training Provider of the Year.
In 2012 Box Hill Institute won Victorian Large Training Provider of the Year.
In 2012 they also won the Premier’s Sustainability Award – Tertiary Education category

Notable alumni
George Calombaris, chef/restaurateur, judge on Masterchef Australia
Chris Cheney, Musician, Guitarist & Lead Vocalist for The Living End
Helen Croome, Musician, Songwriter & Lead Vocalist for Gossling
Guy Grossi, owner of famous Melbourne restaurant Grossi Florentino
Matthew Richardson, Richmond Football Club player
Herb Sawatzky, Former Richmond Football player
Curtis Stone, Chef
Tobie Puttock, Chef (Executive Head-Chef of Melbourne's Fifteen restaurants)

Notable faculty
 Ian Gardiner, artist, woodcut print maker
Dianne Beevers, artist, sculptor, curator

References

External links
Box Hill Institute official site

Australian vocational education and training providers
Australian tertiary institutions
TAFE Colleges in Melbourne
Buildings and structures in the City of Whitehorse
Educational institutions established in 1984
1984 establishments in Australia